Matthew v S is a 2004 Judicial Committee of the Privy Council (JCPC) case which upheld the law that sets out a mandatory sentence of death for murder in Trinidad and Tobago.

The JCPC held in some cases, the law that makes capital punishment mandatory for murder will violate the prohibition on "inhuman or degrading punishment" in the Constitution of Trinidad and Tobago. (This principle is consistent with the 2002 JCPC cases of Hughes, Fox, and Reyes.) However, because (1) the Constitution of Trinidad and Tobago disallows itself to act to invalidate laws that existed prior to the enactment of the constitution, and (2) the law in question pre-dated the constitution, the mandatory death provisions of the law could not be invalidated and must be upheld.

In Boyce v R, which was released on the same day, the JCPC applied the same principles to a similar law in Barbados. Matthew overruled and declared as wrongly decided the November 2003 JCPC decision of Roodal v S, which interpreted the Constitution of Trinidad and Tobago as invalidating the law on mandatory capital punishment for murder.

External links
Matthew v S, bailii.org

2004 in case law
2004 in Trinidad and Tobago
Death penalty case law
Judicial Committee of the Privy Council cases on appeal from Trinidad and Tobago
Prisoners sentenced to death by Trinidad and Tobago
Murder in Trinidad and Tobago
Human rights in Trinidad and Tobago